Australia is home to four professional football codes. This is a comprehensive list of crowd figures for Australian football codes in 2010. It includes several different competitions and matches from Australian rules football, rugby league, football (soccer) and rugby union (international rules football is a code of football played by Australian rules footballers). Sydney and Brisbane have teams represented in all four codes. Hobart and Darwin are Australia's only capital cities without a professional football team.

Included competitions

National competitions
Several football codes have national (domestic) competitions in Australia, the following are taken into consideration:

The 2010 Australian Football League season (AFL), which includes a finals series and a pre-season cup (the 2010 NAB Cup)
The 2010 NRL season (NRL)
The 2010–11 A-League season (A-L)

Two of these leagues, specifically the NRL and A-League, have one team in New Zealand. Attendance figures for the New Zealand teams are not taken into account in the figures on this page.

Other competitions
Other competitions, such as international and representative competitions, included are:

The 2010 Asian Champions League (ACL)
The 2010 State of Origin series (SoO)
The 2010 Rugby League Four Nations (RL 4N)
The 2010 Tri Nations Series (Tri Nat)
The 2010 Super 14 season

Note: For these competitions, only figures for games that take place in Australia are taken into account

Non-competition games
Some Non-competition matches (such as friendly and exhibition matches) are also included:

Home test matches played by the Australian National Association Football Team, the Socceroos, in 2010.
Home test matches played by the Australian National Rugby League Team, the Kangaroos, in 2010.
Home test matches played by the Australian National Rugby Union Team, the Wallabies, in 2010.
NRL All Stars match, in 2010.
E. J. Whitten Legends Game, celebrity and explayer Australian Rules charity exhibition match

Note: this list will be updated as more games are scheduled.

Competitions not included
There are several notable semi-professional regional and state based competitions which draw notable attendances and charge an entry fee that are not listed here.  These are worth mentioning as some of their attendances rival those of national competitions and compete for spectator interest.

These include (ranked by approximate season attendances):

*includes finals

As the attendance figures for some of these competitions can be difficult to obtain (many don't publish season figures and some play matches as curtain raisers to other events), they have not been included in the official lists.

Attendances by Code
In order to directly compare sports, the total attendances for each major code are listed here. The colour-coding of the different codes is used throughout the article.

Note that only the competitions that appear on this page excluding those specifically not included are considered, there are many other (generally smaller) competitions, leagues and matches that take place for all of the football codes, but these are not included. The following are included:

 Rugby union attendances include some games from the Super 14.
 The Rugby league figures include representative matches (State of Origin and International Tests Matches).
 Association football (soccer) attendances include A-League regular season and finals matches, and local attendances for international representative matches.

Attendances by League
Some codes have multiple competitions, several competitions are compared here.

Attendances by Team
Attendances that specific teams pull for their home games are listed here.

Teams are listed by competition – the figures only take regular season games into account

Attendances by match
Attendances for single matches are listed here. Note that not all matches are necessarily included.

Representative competitions
These are matches that are part of a regular representative competition.

Single matches
These are once-off matches, that aren't part of any regular league competition.

Pre-season

Finals

Regular season

See also
2009 Australian football code crowds
Australian rules football attendance records
2010 NRL season results
Sports attendance
List of Australian football codes by social media

Notes

External links
 Official Website of the Australian Football League
 National Rugby League
 A-League Official website
 Asian Champions League Official website

Note: Sources for this article are from Wikipedia related articles regarding the included competitions and teams.

2010 in Australian rugby league
2010 in Australian rugby union
2010 in Australian soccer
2010 in Australian rules football
2010